Clostridium lacusfryxellense is a psychrophilic, Gram-positive, spore-forming and anaerobic bacterium from the genus Clostridium which has been isolated from a microbial mat from Lake Fryxell in Antarctica.

References

 

Bacteria described in 2003
lacusfryxellense